The Compaq Portable 486 is a computer released by Compaq Computer Corporation in 1991. It was the last portable computer/"luggable" released under the Compaq Portable series of computers.

The computer was released in several models with different hard disk configurations and in two screen types, a cheaper monochrome version and a more expensive active matrix color version, known as the Compaq Portable 486c.

Both versions are equipped with a socketed  Intel 80486DX CPU,  DRAM (72-pin SIMM),   floppy,  (P-ATA), and SCSI port for CD-ROM or tape. On the front of the unit there two dials underneath the PC-speaker to adjust the brightness of the screen and the volume of the PC-speaker. The PC-speaker in the Compaq Portable 486 is unique in that there is a  audio input jack on the side of the unit to allow a third party ISA sound card to pass through its audio output to the PC speaker.

Compaq released two versions of the Compaq Portable 486 with a faster,  Intel 80486DX2 CPU, named the Compaq Portable 486/66 for the monochrome version and the Compaq Portable 486/66c for the color version.

Compaq worked with Network General which released branded versions of the Compaq Portable 486 as "Network Sniffers".

A case-modified version of the colour screen variant with replaced internals was used as a prop in the 1995 film Hackers. With its internals replaced by those of a Macintosh laptop, it served as the character Dade Murphy's (Aliases: Zero Cool and Crash Override) primary computer for the first half of the film.

Environmental limits are:
 Temperature operating , nonoperating 
 Relative humidity (noncondensing) Operating , Nonoperating 
 Maximum unpressurized altitude operating , nonoperating 

References

486